The Akhori Dam project is a proposed multipurpose dam in Pakistan, about 60 km west of Islamabad. Developed by Pakistani Water and Power Development Authority (WAPDA) as part of its Water Vision 2025, it has been proposed by the former Pakistan Muslim League (Q)'s Government. 

The dam will be able to store about 8.6 billion cubic metres of water that is split filling the Tarbela reservoir during the monsoon season. It will also host a 600 MW hydropower plant, expected to generate an estimated 2,155 GWh/year.

Controversy
The local people of this area may be opposed to the proposal because they are small land holder agriculturalists, but the government continues to press on.  Government officials claim locals though are willing to give up their land for the better of the nation. With the construction of the dam, as many as 49,320 persons would be displaced and the government would have to bear an environmental and resettlement cost of $0.3 billion. More than thirty villages including Daurdad, Akhori, Humak, Boota, Jabi, and Bathou would be inundated.

References

External links

AKHORI DAM
Youth prove more open-minded than politicians
Ministry recommends $1.6b for Akhroi Dam
Akhori dam and the Tarbela links

Dams in Pakistan
Hydroelectric power stations in Pakistan
Proposed hydroelectric power stations
 Proposed renewable energy power stations in Pakistan